{{DISPLAYTITLE:C19H21NO2}}
The molecular formula C19H21NO2 (molar mass: 295.37 g/mol) may refer to:

 Estrone cyanate, a steroid
 Nuciferine, an alkaloid
 Oxitriptyline, an anticonvulsant
 Propylnorapomorphine, a dopamine agonist
 SKF-77,434
 URB602, a cannabinoid